The Archbishop of Brisbane is the diocesan bishop of the Anglican Diocese of Brisbane, Australia, and ex officio metropolitan bishop of the ecclesiastical Province of Queensland.

List of Bishops and Archbishops of Brisbane

References

External links

 – official site

 
Lists of Anglican bishops and archbishops
Anglican bishops of Brisbane